This article refers to crime in the U.S. state of Iowa.

Statistics
In 2019, there were 7,545 violent-crime incidents, and 8,237 offenses reported in Iowa by 246 law enforcement agencies that submitted National Incident-Based Reporting System (NIBRS) data, and covers 98% of the total population.

With fewer than four crimes reported for every 1,000 people, Iowa's violent crime rate is nearly 15% lower than the national average.

Capital punishment laws
Capital punishment is not applied in this state.

References